St. Andrews Football Club are a Maltese football club from the town of St. Andrew's, Pembroke, which currently plays in the Maltese Challenge League.

History
St. Andrews F.C was founded in 1968 as Luxol St. Andrew's. It is reputed for its highly organised football nursery, which has produced a number of talented players over the years. The senior team competes in the Maltese Premier League, after promotion from the First Division. The club is part of a multi-sports club, called Luxol Sports Club. Their former coaches include Ally Dawson, who was an ex-Rangers captain. The Luxol St. Andrews futsal team is one of the top futsal teams in Malta at the moment, and plays in Malta's top futsal division. St. Andrews currently play out of the newly refurbished Luxol Stadium, one of the most modern grounds on the island.

Players

Current squad

Under-19 squad
Managing the under-19 squad will be Michael Woods and with his Assistant Liam Mangion.

External links

Football clubs in Malta
Association football clubs established in 1968
1968 establishments in Malta
Pembroke, Malta
St. Andrews F.C.